Vesser may refer to:

People
Dale Vesser (born 1932), lieutenant general in the United States Army
John Vesser (1900–1996), American football player, coach of football and basketball, and college athletics administrator

Places
Vesser (Suhl), a district of Suhl, in Thuringia, Germany
Vesser (river), of Thuringia, Germany

See also
Vassar (disambiguation)